Big Band Bossa Nova is a 1962 album by saxophonist Stan Getz with the Gary McFarland Orchestra. The album was arranged and conducted by Gary McFarland and produced by Creed Taylor for Verve Records. This was Getz's second bossa nova album for Verve following Jazz Samba, his very successful collaboration with guitarist Charlie Byrd.

The music was recorded at the CBS 30th Street Studio in New York City on August 27 and 28, 1962.

Music
The music for the album consists of four songs by Brazilian composers and four original compositions by McFarland. The instrumentation chosen by McFarland eschews the traditional big band format of eight brass and five saxophones for a smaller ensemble featuring four woodwinds and French horn as well as three trumpets and two trombones. The four piece rhythm section is augmented by two percussionists.

McFarland freely mixes his instrumental colors to provide a constantly shifting palette in support of Getz's tenor.  Jim Hall, Hank Jones, Doc Severinsen and Bob Brookmeyer are each featured in short solos.

Reception
Although not reaching the chart heights of its predecessor, the album performed respectably on the charts.  On the Billboard Top LP chart, it reached position #13, staying on for 23 weeks.

Noted jazz critic Don DeMichael, writing in the December 6, 1962 issue of Down Beat magazine, awarded the album the top rating of five stars. He said: "Getz' melodic gift was never more evident; even the way he plays "straight" melody is masterful. Few jazzmen have had this gift... and it has to do with singing by means of an instrument, for Getz doesn't just play a solo, he sings it, as can be heard on any of these tracks, most evidently on Triste and Saudade."

About the writing DeMichael says: "McFarland shares in the artistic success of the album. His writing is peerless... he knows the proper combination of instruments to achieve certain sounds and he has the taste not to use all the instruments at hand all the time. His sparing use of the ensemble allows the beauty of the soloist and the material to shine through".

Track listing
 "Manhã de Carnaval" (Morning of the Carnival)  (Luiz Bonfá) – 5:48
 "Balanço no Samba" (Street Dance)  (Gary McFarland) – 2:59
 "Melancólico" (Melancholy)  (Gary McFarland) – 4:42
 "Entre Amigos" (Sympathy Between Friends) (Gary McFarland) – 2:58
 "Chega de Saudade" (No More Blues)  (Antônio Carlos Jobim, Vinícius de Moraes) – 4:10
 "Noite Triste" (Night Sadness)  (Gary McFarland) – 4:56
 "Samba de Uma Nota Só" (One Note Samba)  (Antônio Carlos Jobim, Newton Mendonça) – 3:25
 "Bim Bom" (João Gilberto) – 4:31

Personnel
Stan Getz - tenor saxophone
Doc Severinsen, Bernie Glow or Joe Ferrante and Clark Terry or Nick Travis - trumpet
Ray Alonge - French horn
Bob Brookmeyer or Willie Dennis - trombone
Tony Studd - bass trombone
Gerald Sanfino or Ray Beckenstein - flute
Ed Caine - alto flute
Ray Beckenstein and/or Babe Clark and/or Walt Levinsky - clarinet
Romeo Penque - bass clarinet
Jim Hall - unamplified guitar
Hank Jones - piano
Tommy Williams - bass
Johnny Rae - drums
José Paulo - tambourine
Carmen Costa - cabasa
Gary McFarland - arranger, conductor

Production
Produced by Creed Taylor
Engineered by George Kneurr and Frank Laico

References

Stan Getz albums
Bossa nova albums
1962 albums
Albums arranged by Gary McFarland
Albums produced by Creed Taylor
Verve Records albums